Henricus Grammateus (also known as Henricus Scriptor, Heinrich Schreyber or Heinrich Schreiber; 1495 – 1525 or 1526) was a German mathematician. He was born in Erfurt. In 1507 he started to study at the University of Vienna, where he subsequently taught. Christoph Rudolff was one of his students. From 1514 to 1517 he studied in Cracow and then returned to Vienna. But when the plague affected Vienna Schreiber left the city and went to Nuremberg.

In 1518 he published details of a new musical temperament, which is now named after him, for the harpsichord.  It was a precursor of the equal temperament.

In 1525 Schreiber was back in Vienna, where he is listed as "Examinator", i.e. eligible to work holding exams.

Works 
 Algorithmus proportionum una cum monochordi generalis dyatonici compositione, pub. Volfgangvm De Argentina, Cracow, 1514
 Libellus de compositione regularum pro vasorum mensuratione. Deque arte ista tota theoreticae et practicae, Vienna, 1518
 Ayn new Kunstlich Buech (A New Skill Book), Vienna 1518, Nuremberg 1521 - contains (besides Johannes Widmann) the earliest-known use of the plus and minus signs for addition and subtraction  and is the earliest German text on bookkeeping

References 

1495 births
1525 deaths
Scientists from Erfurt
16th-century German mathematicians
German music theorists
16th-century German writers
16th-century German male writers